Magnús Örn Scheving (born 10 November 1964) is an Icelandic athlete, actor, television producer, writer and entrepreneur. He is the creator,  director, and star of the children's television show LazyTown, in which he also portrayed the character Sportacus.

Childhood and early life
Magnús Scheving was born on 10 November 1964 to Þórveig Hjartardóttir and Eyjólfur Magnússon Scheving. His paternal grandfather was Danish. He grew up in the small town of Borgarnes in Iceland. At 15 years old, he had his first job as a telephone exchange messenger boy for Borgarnes.

He was trained as a sport teacher in his youth, and later decided to retrain in architecture. Though intending to be an architect, he went into carpentry instead. This allowed him to later build his own house, which he described as "physically...[laying] every brick and roof tile." 

In his 20s, he made a bet with a woodworking friend, Fjölnir Þorgeirsson, that each could master a sport of the other's choosing he knew nothing about in three years. Scheving chose snooker for Fjölnir, and Fjölnir chose aerobics for Scheving. Just as Scheving became a champion in aerobics, Fjölnir became Icelandic champion in snooker. He has an older sister and a younger brother.

Early career and inspiration

In 1992, Scheving became the Icelandic Men's Individual Champion in aerobic gymnastics. In 1993, he became the Scandinavian champion, and was the European champion twice in 1994 and 1995. He was voted Athlete of the Year in Iceland in 1994. 

In addition to his sports career, Scheving became a well-known and sought after public and motivational speaker around the world. He also from 1991–93 hosted his own chat show in Iceland, with a format where parents could come on and ask him questions about how to raise healthy children. In 1995, he published a children's book called Áfram Latibær, the first recorded work in the LazyTown franchise. During this time, he was also running a carpentry business, which gave him the money to travel the world. He also was a fitness teacher for teenagers at a local school, having earned a degree in sports science at University of Iceland.

LazyTown

In the 1990s, during his public speaking and aerobics career, Scheving noticed an absence in healthy lifestyle role models for children. In a 2019 TED talk, he recalled,I realized, thirty years ago actually, there was no role model in health for kids. There was Popeye, who eats spinach, but he smoked and hit people. And you thought, maybe that's not a good role model. Maybe we need a different role model for kids. And there was no entertainment brand dedicated to kids' health in the world.In 1995, he published Áfram Latibær, an Icelandic children's book which told a narrative story about a sports elf giving townsfolk tips on how to eat healthily and exercise. The book was adapted into a stage play of the same name directed by Baltasar Kormákur. The show toured Iceland from 1996–1997 and made LazyTown a household name across Iceland. It was shown to be immensely popular among children and so, a sequel was written, Glanni Glæpur Í Latabæ, which was the first time Robbie Rotten was introduced, played by Stefán Karl Stefánsson.

LazyTown was commissioned by Nickelodeon in May 2003 and the first episode aired on Nick Jr. on August 16, 2004.

Scheving is the creator and co-founder of LazyTown Entertainment. This company produces books, videos, games, and sporting goods to help promote fitness and a healthy lifestyle to children. He is also creator of the show LazyTown (Latibær in Iceland), where he played Sportacus (known as Íþróttaálfurinn in Icelandic) from 2004–2014. 

In 2006, Scheving received a Lifetime Achievement Award at the Icelandic Edda Award ceremonies for his work as founder and creator of the LazyTown franchise. Ólafur Ragnar Grímsson, President of Iceland, presented the award to him. 

After LazyTown Entertainment was bought by Turner Broadcasting in the summer of 2011, Scheving continued to play Sportacus. However, in 2014, he announced that he would be departing the role of Sportacus (after the end of the TV series), passing it on to Dýri Kristjánsson, who played Sportacus in all subsequent live shows. He also announced in 2014 that he would depart from his position as CEO of LazyTown Entertainment.

Theme park 
In 2021, Scheving and entrepreneur Helga Halldórsdóttir announced their goal to build Lazytown theme park in Magnús's hometown of Borgarnes, which inspired the series. They claimed the project has been ongoing since 2017. Scheving described the plans to create an "experience garden" with indoor and outdoor facilities, both pertaining to the production history and the history of Borgarnes. Borgarnes legislation supported this due to its ability to welcome tourists; 35 thousand visitors are expected in its first year, followed by 50 thousand in the next 4 years. The park is expected to open by 2024.

April 1st hoax 
On April 1, 2022, Scheving appeared in Icelandic Crossfit athlete Björgvin K. Guðmundsson's facetious Instagram accouncement, wherein a Lazytown "full length motion picture" and "brand new series" was announced. The photographs showed the pair signing contracts and shaking hands before large posters of Lazytown characters and memorabilia. Guðmundsson announced that he was quitting crossfit in pursuit of professional acting, being specifically trained in song and dance to portray Sportacus. Due to its posting date and Guðmundsson's continued career in crossfit, the announcement can be construed as an April Fools' Day hoax.

Other projects
In 2010, Scheving starred in the film alongside with Jackie Chan The Spy Next Door, in which he portrayed a Russian villain attempting to destroy the world's oil supplies.

On November 2nd or 3rd 2022, Scheving spoke at the World Business Forum in New York City on the topic of "great ideas" and creativity. Later that week, he spoke at the WBF in Bogotá, Colombia on November 9th or 10th, on the topic of high performance teams. While in Colombia, Scheving encountered an enthusiastic Sportacus cosplayer.

In a December 2022 interview, Scheving described his work with the Make-a-Wish Foundation:...some kids have only nine days to live. So you come there and they will be dressed up in Sportacus costumes and I would say, you want me to bring you an apple? Not because they want to be healthy, but because they want to do things with me. They want to eat the apples and do push-ups.

ROK restaurant 
Since mid-2016, along with his partner, Hrefna Björk Sverrisdóttir, he has owned and managed ROK restaurant, a "fine casual" Icelandic restaurant in Reykjavík.  The restaurant offers Icelandic staples including reindeer steak, local cheeses, and char. The menu has a "Green" section devoted to vegetarian options, and its dishes incorporates Scandinavian, Mediterranean and American elements.

In 2017, food critic Ragnar Egilsson gave the food a mediocre review, claiming the restaurant's success was due to its proximity to Hallgrimskirkja, a tourist destination.

In 2018, ROK was included in Iceland Monitor's list of the best happy hours in Reykjavik. As of 2019, the menu has expanded to include vegan options.

Filmography

Personal life
Circa 1989, Scheving married Ragnheiður Melsteð, with whom he lived for 24 years. The couple officially divorced in 2014. Magnús and Ragnheiður have a daughter and a son. Scheving also has a daughter with his former partner Halldóra Blöndall. 

In January 2017 Scheving got engaged to Hrefna Björk Sverrisdóttir in their restaurant ROK. The couple got married in 2020. In December 2022, Hrefna announced the birth of their son on her Instagram page. After a three-year hiatus from Instagram, in February 2023, Scheving posted an image of himself and his infant son reclining on a beach in Adeje, Spain, both wearing matching sunglasses, captioned "My son in the sun."

Production work

References

External links

 Magnus Scheving at Instagram
 
 
 
 

1964 births
Carpenters
Living people
Magnús Scheving
Male aerobic gymnasts
Magnús Scheving
Magnús Scheving
Magnús Scheving
Magnús Scheving
Magnús Scheving
Magnús Scheving
Male television personalities